I Was So Unpopular in School and Now They're Giving Me This Beautiful Bicycle is the debut album of Swedish indiepop group Billie the Vision and the Dancers recorded in the spring of 2004. It was released on the record label Love Will Pay the Bills.

In the summer of 2009, the song "Summercat" became popular in Spain thanks to its use in an advertising campaign of Estrella Damm.

Track listing
"Summercat" - 3:02
"Good and Bad" - 3:16
"Nobel Square" - 3:41
"Ask for More" - 3:48
"Do You Remember" - 4:41
"Stay Awake" - 3:15
"City" - 4:08
"Apologize" - 3:27
"No One Knows You" - 4:53
"Jackass" - 3:12
"Want to Cannot Help but Dance" - 4:06

References

2004 debut albums
Billie the Vision and the Dancers albums